Khonkaen International Convention and Exhibition Center (KICE) is a convention center and exhibition hall in Khon Kaen, Thailand. It was built by CP Land, with an investment of almost 2 billion baht (60 million USD). The center is expected to help raise Khon Kaen's profile as a MICE (Meetings, incentives, conferencing, exhibitions) destination, a move promoted by the Thailand Convention and Exhibition Bureau.

References

The Opportunity 
Provide premium audio and an immaculate guest experience for a wide range of events at the Khonkaes International Convention Center (KICE). Located in the city of Khonkaen, KICE is one of the most popular and versatile venues in Northeastern of Thailand and will be the convention hub with facilities of the fastest internet speed, the highest AV Technology and premium interior design in this part of Thailand. KICE’s crown jewel is its nearly 150,700 square foot main exhibition hall with room-combined function as well as another 7 individual meeting rooms, which regularly hosts high profile events ranging from corporate meetings and conferences to exhibitions.
Buildings and structures in Khon Kaen province
Convention centers in Thailand
Tourist attractions in Khon Kaen province
Buildings and structures completed in 2017
2017 establishments in Thailand